Therese Olausson (born 13 January 1968) is a Swedish equestrian. She competed in the team eventing at the 1996 Summer Olympics.

References

External links
 

1968 births
Living people
Swedish female equestrians
Olympic equestrians of Sweden
Equestrians at the 1996 Summer Olympics
People from Borås
Sportspeople from Västra Götaland County